Philip Warner (born 2 February 1979) is an English retired semi-professional footballer, who played as a utility player in the Premier League for Southampton and in the Football League for Cambridge United and Brentford. After his release from Cambridge United in 2003, he dropped into non-League football and had a brief spell playing in Australia.

Career

Southampton 
A utility player, Warner began his career in the youth system at Premier League club Southampton and signed his first professional contract in August 1997. He made his senior debut as a 39th-minute substitute for Jason Dodd in a 1–1 draw with Tottenham Hotspur on 10 May 1998. Warner made six appearances during the 1998–99 season, but failed to appear after October 1998. On 2 July 1999, Warner joined newly promoted Second Division club Brentford on a season-long loan, with a view to a permanent move. He made just 15 appearances and returned to The Dell two months early, in March 2000. Warner returned to the Southampton first team squad during the 2000–01 season, but failed to make any further appearances before his release in May 2001.

Cambridge United 
On 31 May 2001, Warner signed a two-year contract with Second Division club Cambridge United on a free transfer. He made just 16 appearances during the 2001–02 season, at the end of which the Us were relegated to the Third Division. Warner was mostly out of favour with manager John Taylor during the first half of the 2002–03 season and was released on 10 January 2003, in a cost-cutting exercise. He made 26 appearances during 18 months at the Abbey Stadium.

Non-League football 
On 24 January 2003, Warner dropped into non-League football to join Wessex League club Eastleigh. Over the following six years he also would play for Aldershot Town, Eastbourne Borough, Havant & Waterlooville, Bognor Regis Town and Totton, before travelling to Australia and playing for Heidelberg United. Warner joined his final club, Poole Town, in 2010 and retired in 2011.

Personal life 
Warner attended Redbridge Community School. As of January 2008, he was living in Bassett and was working as a van driver and property developer. After his retirement from football in 2011, he became a sports masseur.

Career statistics

Honours 
Eastleigh
 Wessex League: 2002–03

References

External links

Phil Warner at premierleague.com

1979 births
Living people
English footballers
Premier League players
Southampton F.C. players
Brentford F.C. players
Cambridge United F.C. players
Eastleigh F.C. players
Aldershot Town F.C. players
Eastbourne Borough F.C. players
Havant & Waterlooville F.C. players
A.F.C. Totton players
Association football utility players
Bognor Regis Town F.C. players
Heidelberg United FC players
English expatriate footballers
English expatriate sportspeople in Australia
Expatriate soccer players in Australia
Poole Town F.C. players
English Football League players
Southern Football League players
National League (English football) players
Association football fullbacks